Stilyan Nikolov (Bulgarian: Стилян Николов; born 16 July 1991) is a Bulgarian professional footballer who plays as a defender for Beroe.

References

External links

1991 births
Living people
Bulgarian footballers
First Professional Football League (Bulgaria) players
FC Chavdar Etropole players
FC Lyubimets players
OFC Pirin Blagoevgrad players
FC Septemvri Sofia players
PFC Beroe Stara Zagora players
Association football central defenders